Kaaawa is a small community and census-designated place (CDP) located in the windward district of Koolauloa, City & County of Honolulu on the island of Oahu, Hawaii, United States. As of the 2010 Census, the total population for Kaaawa was 1,379. In Hawaiian, kaaawa means "the wrasse (fish)".

Kaaawa is north of Kāneohe Bay (north of Kaōio Point, also Kalaeokaōio), and the Pacific Ocean shore here is fronted by a broad fringing reef with a narrow, but quite inviting beach (Kanenelu Beach, Kalaeōio Beach Park, and Kaaawa Beach Park).  The around-the-island-highway (Kamehameha Highway, State Rte. 83) and the houses and other buildings comprising the town, are confined to a relatively narrow belt along the coast. However, a long valley extends inland. Kaaawa Valley is part of Kualoa Ranch and used for various tourist activities as well as filming. Major films and TV series incorporating significant views of the valley include George of the Jungle, Jurassic Park and Lost.

The U.S. postal code for Kaaawa is 96730.

Geography 
Kaaawa is located at  (21.557050, -157.855148). Kaaawa is north of Kualoa and directly southeast of Kahana Bay. The next place beyond Kahana is Punaluʻu.

The total area is 39.72% water.

Demographics 

As of the 2000 Census, there were 1,324 people, 469 households, and 323 families residing in the Ka'a'awa census tract. The racial makeup of the CDP was 35.88% White, 0.45% Black or African American, 0.38% Native American, 8.76% Asian, 22.66% Pacific Islander, 1.13% from other races, and 30.74% from two or more races.  8.23% of the population were Hispanic or Latino of any race.

Of the 469 households 31.1% had children under the age of 18 living with them, 52.5% were married couples living together, 10.4% had a female householder with no husband present, and 31.1% were non-families. 24.3% of households were one person and 6.2% were one person aged 65 or older.  The average household size was 2.82 and the average family size was 3.36.

The age distribution was 26.4% under the age of 18, 7.6% from 18 to 24, 28.9% from 25 to 44, 26.1% from 45 to 64, and 11.0% 65 or older.  The median age was 38 years.  For every 100 females there were 97.0 males.  For every 100 females age 18 and over, there were 97.6 males.

The median household income was $54,500 and the median family income  was $60,156. Males had a median income of $42,500 versus $28,906 for females. The per capita income for the CDP was $21,881.  11.8% of the population and 9.0% of families were below the poverty line.  Out of the total population, 20.2% of those under the age of 18 and 3.0% of those 65 and older were living below the poverty line.

Education
The Hawaii Department of Education operates the public schools. Kaaawa Elementary School is in the CDP.

References

External links

Census-designated places in Honolulu County, Hawaii
Populated places on Oahu
Populated coastal places in Hawaii